Rupert is an unincorporated community in Union Township, Madison County, Ohio, United States.

The Rupert Post Office was established on May 2, 1894, but was discontinued on August 31, 1901.  The mail service is now sent through the London branch.  As of 1915, the community contained a general store, a blacksmith, and only a few houses.

References 

Unincorporated communities in Madison County, Ohio
Unincorporated communities in Ohio